Silent commerce is the execution of business transactions between electronic devices. It happens without assistance and in some cases even without awareness of the human owners of those devices.

Another name for electronic commerce where automated financial exchanges are transacted between two or more machines without human intervention.

E-commerce